Kevin Krawietz and Andreas Mies were the defending champions but chose to compete in Rotterdam instead.

Dominic Inglot and Aisam-ul-Haq Qureshi won the title, defeating Steve Johnson and Reilly Opelka in the final, 7–6(7–5), 7–6(8–6).

Seeds

Draw

Draw

References

 Main Draw

New York Open
New York Open (tennis)